Revelation: Revolution '69 is the fifth and final studio album (and seventh album overall) by the Lovin' Spoonful, released in December1968.

History
Revelation: Revolution '69 is the final studio album by the group.  It features Joe Butler as lead singer on most tracks, following the departure of former lead vocalist and songwriter John Sebastian. Almost all the songwriting for the album is divided fairly equally amongst three songwriting teams: Garry Bonner and Alan Gordon (notable for their earlier compositions for The Turtles); Ralph Dino and John Sembello; and producer Bob Finiz and Joe Butler.  Butler also wrote one song on his own. The album also included "Never Going Back", which was written by John Stewart and had been released in 1968 as a single.

Revelation: Revolution '69 was reissued on CD in 2008, in Japan only, with three bonus tracks—two edited versions of the title track, and the remixed single edit of "Me About You". It was also reissued in 2011 in the UK as part of the box set The Lovin' Spoonful: Original Album Classics. Both reissues include three bonus tracks.

Track listing
 "Amazing Air" (Bonner, Gordon) – 2:50
 "Never Going Back" (John Stewart) – 2:48
 "The Prophet" (Finiz, Butler) – 2:45
 "Only Yesterday" (Dino, Sembello) – 2:43
 "War Games" (Butler) – 7:02
 "(Till I) Run With You" (Gordon, Bonner) – 2:52
 "Jug of Wine" (Dino, Sembello) – 2:31
 "Revelation: Revolution '69" (Butler, Finiz) – 2:29
 "Me About You" (Bonner, Gordon) – 3:48
 "Words" (Dino, Sembello) – 2:18
2008 rerelease bonus tracks:
 "Revelation: Revolution '69" [Single Version/Alternate Mix]
 "Revelation: Revolution '69" [Single Version/Alternate Mix, Vocal]
 "Me About You" [Single Version/Alternate Mix]

Reception
Allmusic gave the album two out of five stars, saying "this flawed gem came out of left field," and praising the songs "Never Going Back" and, to a lesser extent, "Run With You" while strongly criticizing the tracks that Joe Butler wrote, especially "War Games."

References

Sources

 

The Lovin' Spoonful albums
1969 albums
Kama Sutra Records albums